The 1868 Oxford by-election was fought on 22 December 1868.  The by-election was fought due to the incumbent Liberal, Edward Cardwell, becoming Secretary of State for War.  It was retained by Cardwell who was unopposed.

References

1868 elections in the United Kingdom
1868 in England
19th century in Oxfordshire
December 1868 events
Elections in Oxford
By-elections to the Parliament of the United Kingdom in Oxfordshire constituencies
Unopposed ministerial by-elections to the Parliament of the United Kingdom in English constituencies